Akhisar is a village in the Karacabey district of Bursa Province in Turkey.

It is located southwest of Karacabey and 22 km from the district.

References 

Villages in Karacabey District